Piprites is a genus of bird traditionally placed in the family Tyrannidae.

Species
The genus Piprites contains 3 species:

References

 
Bird genera
Taxonomy articles created by Polbot